Huntington is an unincorporated community in Ralls County, in the U.S. state of Missouri.

History
A post office called Huntington was established in 1878, and remained in operation until 1969. The community has the name of Collis Potter Huntington, a railroad magnate.

References

Unincorporated communities in Ralls County, Missouri
Unincorporated communities in Missouri